The Horti Tauriani (Latin for ‘Taurian gardens’) were a large set of gardens in ancient Rome around the residence of Statilius Taurus, an eminent character of the 1st century CE.  They were perhaps the motive for his conviction on a charge of sorcery, which allowed Agrippina to confiscate them and add them to the imperial estates.  They were then divided into different properties. 

The gardens were partly reunited under Gallienus in the mid 3rd century, but began to split again in late antiquity, being centred round the residence of Vettius Agorius Praetextatus as the Horti Vettiani.  

From this area come numerous attributable sculptures from the gardens' different phases: statues of deities, decorative reliefs, two large marble craters, and three splendid portraits of Hadrian, Sabina, and Matidia.

See also
Roman gardens

External links
Capitoline Museums

Tauriani